Over is the sixth studio album by the English singer and songwriter Peter Hammill, released on Charisma Records in April 1977. It was issued for the first time on CD on Virgin Records in the early 1990s, and was reissued again in a remastered version in 2006 with bonus tracks.

The album details the break-up of a long-term relationship with a woman known as Alice. The album was originally to be called Over My Shoulder with a different cover shot in which Hammill was caught looking back over his shoulder with a very mixed expression.

The album was recorded during a period of line-up change for Hammill's band Van der Graaf Generator. It features VdGG drummer Guy Evans, VdGG's future recruit Graham Smith (formerly of String Driven Thing) on violin, and the return of VdGG's bass player from 1969 to 1970, Nic Potter.

"This Side of the Looking Glass" was re-worked for Hammill's 1984 album The Love Songs.

Track listing

Personnel 
Peter Hammill – vocals, acoustic and electric guitars , piano , synthesizer , Hammond organ 
Nic Potter – bass 
Guy Evans – drums 
Graham Smith – violin 
Michael Brand – orchestra conductor

Technical
Dave Anderson, Ian Gomm – recording engineers (Foel Studio, Llanfair Caereinion)
Pat Moran – recording engineer, mixing (Rockfield Studios, Monmouthshire)
Frank Sansom – art direction
Sebastian Keep – photography

References

External links 

 Lyrics on Hammill's Sofa Sound website
 Album information on the unofficial VdGG site

Over (1977 album)
Over
Charisma Records albums
Albums recorded at Rockfield Studios